Myscelus is a Neotropical genus of skippers in the family Hesperiidae.

Species
Myscelus amystis (Hewitson, 1867)  Mexico, Guatemala,  Panama,  Colombia, Trinidad and Tobago,  Bolivia, Ecuador,  Peru, Paraguay,  Argentina, Brazil.
Myscelus assaricus (Cramer, [1779]) Mexico, Panama,  Bolivia, Suriname, Guyana, Guyane. 
Myscelus belti Godman & Salvin, 1879  Mexico, Guatemala, Costa Rica, Nicaragua, Panama.
Myscelus draudti Riley, 1926  Bolivia.
Myscelus epimachia Herrich-Schäffer, 1869 Bolivia, Paraguay,  Ecuador,  Bolivia,  Peru,  Brazil.
Myscelus nobilis (Cramer, [1777])  Bolivia, Peru,  Suriname.
Myscelus pardalina (C. & R. Felder, [1867])  Colombia,  Ecuador, Brazil.
Myscelus pegasus Mabille, 1903 Ecuador, Venezuela, French Guiana.
Myscelus perissodora Dyar, 1914  Mexico, Colombia.
Myscelus phoronis (Hewitson, 1867)  Colombia,  Venezuela, Bolivia, Peru.
Myscelus santhilarius (Latreille, [1824]) Brazil, Suriname, Guyana, French Guiana.

References

Natural History Museum Lepidoptera genus database

External links
images representing Myscelus at Consortium for the Barcode of Life

Hesperiidae
Hesperiidae of South America
Hesperiidae genera